Capel Hanbury (1707–1765) was an Anglo-Welsh businessman and Whig politician.

Life
He was the third son of John Hanbury of Pontypool, an ironmaster, and his second wife Bridget Ayscough, daughter of Sir Edward Ayscough; and brother of Charles Hanbury Williams. He matriculated at Christ Church, Oxford in 1723. On his father's death in 1734, he inherited the family ironworks.

In politics  the Hanburys were Whigs, and allies of the Monmouthshire Morgan family. Capel Hanbury at the end of his life was a Rockingham Whig. He first became a Member of Parliament for Leominster in 1741, on the basis of a connection with Lady Coningsby.

Family
Hanbury married Jane Tracy, daughter of Thomas Charles Tracy, 5th Viscount Tracy. They had one son, John Hanbury, and two daughters Henrietta and Frances who died unmarried.

Notes

1707 births
1765 deaths
Members of the Parliament of Great Britain for Monmouthshire
British businesspeople
Members of the Parliament of Great Britain for English constituencies